Regiment or Regimental system (polk; , polkovyi ustrii) is a historical administrative, territorial, military and judicial unit of country's subdivision in Cossack Hetmanate and Sloboda Ukraine in 17th and 18th centuries.

The system was expanded out of already existing system of Registered Cossacks over Kyiv, Bratslav, and Chernihiv voivodeships.

Regiments were headed by colonel (polkovnyk) who was a member of the Council of Officers (Rada Starshyn).

Further reading
Diadychenko, V. Overview of public and political system of the Left-bank Ukraine at the end of 17th - the start of 18th centuries (Нариси суспільно-політичного устрою Лівобережної України кінця XVII – початку XVIII ст.) Kyiv, 1959
Gajecky, G. The Cossack Administration of the Hetmanate. 2 vols. Cambridge, Mass 1978
 Maksymovych, M. Overview of municipal regiments and hundreds that existed in Ukraine from the times of Bohdan Khmelnytsky in the book of M.Maksymovych "Collection of works" (Обзор городовых полков и сотен, бывших на Украине со времени Богдана Хмельницкого. В кн.: Максимович М.А. Собрание сочинений). Volume 1. Kiev, 1876
 Petrovsky, M. To the history of regimental system of Hetmanate. "Notes of the Nizhyn Institute of National Education and the Nizhyn Research Department of History, Culture and Language, Book 9" (До історії полкового устрою Гетьманщини. "Записки Ніжинського ІНО та ніжинської науково-дослідної катедри історії, культури й мови, кн. 9"). Nizhyn, 1929
 1649 Registry of Zaporizhian Host (Реєстр Війська Запорозького 1649 року). Kiev, 1995

External links
 Zhukovsky, A. Regimental system. Encyclopedia of Ukraine.
 Panashenko, V. Regimental system. Encyclopedia of History of Ukraine.

Former subdivisions of Ukraine
Hetmanate 1
Cossack Hetmanate